Bailou may refer to the following locations in China:

Bailou, Hebei, a town in Baoding, Hebei
Bailou, Zhoukou, Henan
Bailou Township, Sui County, Henan